Yugala Dighambara, Prince of Lopburi (March 17, 1882 – April 8, 1932) , was a son of King Chulalongkorn of Siam.

Early life and education
The Prince graduated from Cambridge University. He served as Viceroy of the South during the reign of his half-brother King Vajiravhud and as the Minister of the Interior in the government of King Prajadhipok.

Personal life
He married Princess Chalermkhetra Mangala (Bhanubandh), a daughter of Prince Bhanurangsi Savangwongse. Their grandson is the filmmaker Prince Chatrichalerm Yugala.

Death
According to the announcement of his death in the Royal Gazette, Prince Yugala suffered from heart disease, dying at 3:05 p.m. on April 8, 1932.

Honours
Prince Yugala received the following decorations in the Honours System of Thailand:
 Knight of The Most Illustrious Order of the Royal House of Chakri
 Knight of The Ancient and Auspicious Order of the Nine Gems
 Knight Grand Cordon (Special Class) of The Most Illustrious Order of Chula Chom Klao
 The Knight of the Ratana Varabhorn Order of Merit
 Knight Grand Cordon (Special Class) of the Most Exalted Order of the White Elephant
 Knight Grand Cross (First Class) of the Most Noble Order of the Crown of Thailand
 Knight Commander of the Honourable Order of Rama
 King Rama IV Royal Cypher Medal, Second Class
 King Rama V Royal Cypher Medal, First Class
 King Rama VI Royal Cypher Medal, First Class
 King Rama VII Royal Cypher Medal, First Class
 Dushdi Mala Medal – Military

Ancestry

References

1882 births
1932 deaths
19th-century Thai people
Thai male Chao Fa
19th-century Chakri dynasty
20th-century Chakri dynasty
Yukol family
Knights Grand Cordon of the Order of Chula Chom Klao
Knights Commander (Maha Yodhin) of the Order of Rama
Knights of the Ratana Varabhorn Order of Merit
Recipients of the Dushdi Mala Medal, Pin of Arts and Science
Children of Chulalongkorn
Ministers of Interior of Thailand
Sons of kings